Keith Alan Bell (third ¼ 1953) is an English former professional rugby league footballer who played in the 1970s, 1980s and 1990s, and coached.
coached at club level for the Featherstone Lions.

Background
Keith Bell's birth was registered in Wakefield district, West Riding of Yorkshire, England.

Playing career

County honours
Keith Bell won 4-caps for Yorkshire while at the Featherstone Rovers; during the 1977–78 season against Cumbria and Lancashire, during the 1979–80 season against Cumbria, and during the 1981–82 season against Cumbria

Challenge Cup Final appearances
Keith Bell played  in the Featherstone Rovers' 9–24 defeat by Warrington in the 1974 Challenge Cup Final during the 1973–74 season at Wembley Stadium, London on Saturday 11 May 1974, in front of a crowd of 77,400.

County Cup Final appearances
Keith Bell played  (replaced by interchange/substitute Johnny Spells) in the Featherstone Rovers' 12–16 defeat by Leeds in the 1976 Yorkshire County Cup Final during the 1976–77 season, at Headingley Rugby Stadium, Leeds on Saturday 16 October 1976, and played  in the 7–17 defeat by Castleford in the 1977 Yorkshire County Cup Final during the 1977–78 season, at Headingley Rugby Stadium, Leeds on Saturday 15 October 1977.

Club career
Keith Bell made his début for the Featherstone Rovers on Sunday 28 November 1971, during his time at the Featherstone Rovers he scored forty-four 3-point tries, and thirteen 4-point tries, and he played his last match for the Featherstone Rovers during the 1989–90 season.

Testimonial match
Keith Bell's benefit season/testimonial match at the Featherstone Rovers took place during the 1984–85 season.

Honoured at Featherstone Rovers
Keith Bell is a Featherstone Rovers Hall of Fame Inductee.

Genealogical information
Keith Bell is the son of the rugby league  for the Featherstone Rovers (Heritage № 152); Jimmy Bell, and Caroline (née Townend), and is the youngest brother of the rugby league  for the Featherstone Rovers (Heritage № 387); Roy Bell, the rugby league  for the Featherstone Rovers (Heritage № 438); Peter Bell, Carol A. Bell (birth registered during second ¼  in Pontefract district), and the rugby league  for the Featherstone Rovers (Heritage № 463); John Bell.

References

External links
Jimmy Bell, Roy Bell, Peter Bell, John Bell and Keith Bell

1953 births
Living people
English rugby league coaches
English rugby league players
Featherstone Rovers captains
Featherstone Rovers players
Hunslet R.L.F.C. players
Rugby league locks
Rugby league props
Rugby league second-rows
Rugby league players from Wakefield
Yorkshire rugby league team players